Georgia's 9th Senate District elects one member of the Georgia Senate. Its current representative is Democrat Nikki Merritt.

Georgia Senate districts
Gwinnett County, Georgia